Livas is a settlement in Xanthi, Greece.

Populated places in Xanthi (regional unit)